Sima Zhi (190s - 230s), courtesy name Zihua, was a government official who served in the state of Cao Wei during the Three Kingdoms period of China. He previously served under the warlord Cao Cao during the late Eastern Han dynasty.

Early life
Sima Zhi was from Wen County, Henei Commandery, which is present-day Wen County, Henan. He was a distant cousin of Sima Lang and Sima Yi, whose descendants became the ruling family of the Jin dynasty. In his early life, when he was still a relative nobody compared to his cousins, Yang Jun (楊俊) recognised his potential and remarked, "Sima Zhi may not be as well known as Sima Lang, but he is actually more talented (than Sima Lang)."

Originally a scholar, Sima Zhi had to leave home when chaos broke out throughout China in the final decades of the Eastern Han dynasty. While en route to Jing Province (covering present-day Hubei and Hunan) in southern China, he and his fellow travellers encountered bandits in the hills near Luyang County (魯陽縣; present-day Lushan County, Henan). As the bandits approached, the other travellers abandoned their elderly and frail companions and fled. Sima Zhi remained behind to protect his mother. When the bandits brandished their weapons at him, he kowtowed and begged them to spare his mother: "My mother is old. Please help me take care of her!" The bandits said, "He's a filial son. It would be unrighteous for us to kill him." They spared him and his mother. Sima Zhi later found a cart for his mother to ride as they continued their journey towards the south.

Sima Zhi lived in Jing Province for over ten years and spent his time farming. He also strictly adhered to moral principles.

Service under Cao Cao

As a county chief
In 208, Cao Cao, the warlord who controlled the Han central government, seized control of Jing Province after the provincial governor Liu Cong surrendered to him. Cao Cao recruited Sima Zhi into government service and appointed him as the Chief of Jian County (菅縣; east of present-day Jiyang County, Shandong).

Around the time, as the Han Empire was in a state of disorder, there were many people who openly disregarded the laws. In Qing Province's Jinan Commandery, which Jian County was under, there was one Liu Jie who served as a registrar in the commandery office. Liu Jie came from an elite background and had over 1,000 retainers under him. Some of them were actually robbers and bandits, while others were corrupt bureaucrats.

When it was time for Wang Tong and some other retainers under Liu Jie to serve in the army, Sima Zhi's personal assistants reminded their superior that Liu Jie had never allowed anyone from his household to perform mandatory military service. Sima Zhi then wrote a letter to Liu Jie as follows: "Sir, you come from an influential family and occupy an important position in the commandery office, yet you allow your retainers to repeatedly avoid serving in the army. The people are very resentful and disappointed. Even the higher-level officials know about this. Wang Tong and the others are due to report for military service. Please send them over when it is time."

On the day the men were ordered to report for duty, Liu Jie not only refused to send Wang Tong and the others to the camp, but also secretly instructed (or bribed) a commandery-level inspector to go to Jian County and deliberately find fault with Sima Zhi's administration. Sima Zhi's subordinates felt intimidated by the inspector so they agreed to serve in the army in place of Liu Jie's retainers. When Sima Zhi found out, he wrote to Hao Guang, the Administrator of Jinan Commandery, to explain the situation and expose Liu Jie's wrongdoings. Hao Guang, who respected and trusted Sima Zhi, realised that Liu Jie was in the wrong so he ordered Liu Jie to serve in the army. Liu Jie had no choice but to follow orders. After this incident, there was a saying circulating around Qing Province: "(Sima Zhi) turned a commandery registrar into a soldier."

Refusal to associate with Liu Xun
Sima Zhi later became the Prefect of Guangping County (廣平縣; north of present-day Quzhou County, Hebei). At the time, Liu Xun, one of Cao Cao's generals, behaved arrogantly because he believed that, given his past acquaintance with Cao Cao, no one would dare to do anything to him. When he was in charge of guarding Henei Commandery, Sima Zhi's home commandery, he allowed his relatives, subordinates and retainers to behave lawlessly and do as they wished.

Liu Xun once wrote a letter to Sima Zhi, without signing off, to ask him for favours. Sima Zhi ignored Liu Xun and continued to do everything by the book. Later, when Liu Xun was accused of plotting a rebellion, many people who had connections to him were implicated and arrested. Sima Zhi, who was unaffected by the incident, received praise for his wisdom in choosing to distance himself from Liu Xun.

As a judicial officer and commandery administrator
Sima Zhi later served as a dalizheng (大理正; senior judicial officer) in Cao Cao's vassal kingdom of Wei after Emperor Xian enfeoffed the warlord as a vassal king in the year 216.

During this time, Sima Zhi heard a case of theft in which a maid was accused of stealing silk from the official treasury and hiding it in the latrine. She had already been arrested and thrown into prison for interrogation.

After hearing the case, Sima Zhi wrote to Cao Cao:  Cao Cao heeded Sima Zhi's advice.

Sima Zhi was later reassigned to be the Administrator of Ganling (甘陵; around present-day Linqing, Shandong), Pei (沛; around present-day Xuzhou, Jiangsu) and Yangping (陽平; around present-day Handan, Hebei) commanderies. He performed well while serving in these offices.

Service under Cao Pi
Sima Zhi continued serving in the state of Cao Wei, established by Cao Cao's son Cao Pi, after the end of the Eastern Han dynasty in late 220. In the middle of Cao Pi's reign, he was appointed as the Intendant of Henan, i.e., the administrator of the capital commandery. During his tenure, he kept elite influence in check, helped the poor, and governed in an impartial manner without showing favour to anyone. He also managed to convince Cao Pi to restore the wuzhu coinage, which was previously used in the Han dynasty, as an official currency of the Cao Wei state.

On one occasion, a palace official wanted a favour from Sima Zhi but was afraid to ask him directly, so he requested Dong Zhao, an uncle of Sima Zhi's wife, to ask on his behalf. However, Dong Zhao also felt intimidated by Sima Zhi and did not ask him.

Sima Zhi once lectured his subordinates: 

His subordinates heeded his words and worked diligently and faithfully.

In one incident, a sentry serving under one of Sima Zhi's subordinates was arrested on suspicions of stealing a hairstick. Although his statement contradicted the evidence, the authorities still deemed him guilty and threw him into prison. When Sima Zhi heard about it, he remarked:

Service under Cao Rui
In 226, after Cao Rui succeeded his father Cao Pi as the new emperor of Wei, he enfeoffed Sima Zhi as a Secondary Marquis to honour him for his contributions.

Case of Princess Linfen's servant and Cao Hong's wet nurse
Shortly after, a servant of Princess Linfen and the former wet nurse of the veteran general Cao Hong were arrested and imprisoned for heresy because they worshipped a certain "deity" of Mount Wujian at the northeast of Luoyang.

Grand Empress Dowager Bian, Cao Rui's grandmother, sent a palace eunuch, Wu Da, to order Sima Zhi to release Cao Hong's wet nurse and Princess Linfen's servant. Sima Zhi did not inform Cao Rui about the Grand Empress Dowager's interference in the case. Instead, he instructed the officials in charge of the case to continue performing their duties accordingly.

After the case was closed, Sima Zhi wrote a memorial to Cao Rui: 

Cao Rui replied: "I have read your memorial and I understand your intentions. You did the right thing when you followed the imperial edict and authorised the officials to perform their duties. As you were acting in accordance with an imperial edict, you did nothing wrong so there is no need to apologise. You do not have to inform me the next time a palace eunuch comes to see you."

As the Intendant of Henan
Sima Zhi served as the Intendant of Henan for 11 years. During his tenure, he dealt with numerous complex legal cases (e.g. cases in which the law could not be applied straightforwardly) and gained a reputation in the Wei imperial court for being impartial and fair.

In 231, when the various princes came from their respective principalities to Luoyang to pay tribute to Cao Rui, some of them violated imperial protocol by privately visiting officials based in Luoyang without permission. (The princes were forbidden from contacting officials in the central government without permission from the emperor.) When these violations came to light, Sima Zhi was accused of negligence as he allowed them to happen under his watch. As a result, he was removed from office.

As Minister of Finance
Sima Zhi was later restored to government service as Minister of Finance. Before he assumed office, the officials in charge of agricultural production had, in fact, been encouraging their subordinates and the common people to focus more on commercial rather than agricultural activities because commerce was more profitable.

Sima Zhi assessed the situation and wrote a memorial to Cao Rui: 

Cao Rui heeded Sima Zhi's advice.

Later life and death
At the time, when some officials were summoned to meet their superiors, they often consulted their superiors' personal assistants to find out what their superiors wanted. The personal assistants then advised them accordingly and taught them how to provide satisfactory answers to their superiors. Sima Zhi, in contrast, was known for being candid, outspoken and upright. When he had disagreements with his colleagues during discussions, he voiced his objections in front of them, criticised them directly and never spoke behind their backs.

Sima Zhi died in office in an unknown year. His family did not have any excess wealth at the time of his death. Throughout the Cao Wei state's existence from 220 to 265, none of the persons who served as the Intendant of Henan managed to perform better in office than Sima Zhi.

Descendants
Sima Zhi's son, Sima Qi, inherited his father's peerage as a Secondary Marquis. He initially served as an assistant official in Henan before he was reassigned to be a judicial officer. Later, he was promoted to the position of Chancellor of Chenliu State (陳留國; around present-day Kaifeng, Henan).

During his tenure, the Wei imperial court ordered several prisoners to be transferred from Liang Commandery (梁郡; around present-day Shangqiu, Henan) to the counties in Chenliu State. All these prisoners were actually suspects being held in custody because their cases had yet to be settled in court. When the imperial edict reached Chenliu State, the county officials wrote to Sima Qi to seek permission to start building more prison cells and prepare the equipment required to hold the incoming prisoners. Sima Qi replied: "There are tens of such prisoners. They are cunning and deceptive. While they haven't confessed their guilt, they have already grown tired of being held in custody. You can tell from the way they are behaving. Why then should we continue to hold them in long-term custody?" When the prisoners were transferred over, Sima Qi interrogated them, determined their guilt, and settled all the cases within one morning. He was subsequently promoted to the position of Minister of Justice.

When Sima Qi was Minister of Justice, the regent Cao Shuang monopolised power and controlled the Wei central government along with his supporters such as He Yan and Deng Yang. When one Gui Tai from Nanyang Commandery verbally defied an imperial edict, he was arrested and sent to the Ministry of Justice for interrogation. Deng Yang, who was in charge of dealing with the case, ordered Gui Tai to be severely tortured to force him to admit his guilt. When Sima Qi heard about it, he reprimanded Deng Yang: "The officials serving in the central government agencies are the pillars of our state. You are already failing to promote civil culture and morality, and you can't match the standards set by the ancients. What you are doing is exacting petty revenge on others and framing the innocent. You make the people feel panicky and fearful. Isn't this what you are doing?"

Deng Yang, feeling angry and embarrassed, gave up and backed down. Sima Qi later thought that he might have offended Cao Shuang and his supporters, and feared that they would find ways to get back at him so he claimed that he was ill and resigned. He died at the age of 35 (by East Asian age reckoning) at home. His son, Sima Zhao, inherited his peerage as a Secondary Marquis. Sima Zhao served as a Master of Writing and as the Inspector of Ji Province during the Taikang era (280–289) of the reign of Emperor Wu in the Jin dynasty.

See also
 Lists of people of the Three Kingdoms

Notes

References

 Chen, Shou (3rd century). Records of the Three Kingdoms (Sanguozhi).
 
 Pei, Songzhi (5th century). Annotations to Records of the Three Kingdoms (Sanguozhi zhu).
 

2nd-century births
3rd-century deaths
Officials under Cao Cao
Politicians from Jiaozuo
Han dynasty politicians from Henan
Political office-holders in Henan
Political office-holders in Shandong
Political office-holders in Hebei
Political office-holders in Jiangsu